Do the Best is a greatest hits album by the musical group Do As Infinity, released in 2002. In 2004, a combined compilation Do the Best + DVD was released. Some of the tracks in the album have minor changes, such as "Oasis" having an actual, definite ending unlike the original single where it previously had faded out instead. "Nice & Easy" was a brand new song that was included, it was also used as the theme song for a Lavenus commercial song featuring lead singer and musician, Tomiko Van. The CD+DVD version of the album is a re-release which was released in 2004 and included a DVD with numerous (either live or promotional) videos of the first thirteen tracks of the CD album.

Track listing

Chart positions

1Original CD release
²Do The Best+DVD

External links
 Do the Best at Avex Network
 Do the Best at Oricon
 Do The Best+DVD at Oricon
 Do the Best+DVD at Avex Network

2002 greatest hits albums
2004 greatest hits albums
Do As Infinity albums
Do As Infinity video albums
2004 video albums
Music video compilation albums
Avex Group compilation albums
Avex Group video albums
Albums produced by Seiji Kameda